Mount Edziza  is a stratovolcano in the Stikine Country of northwestern British Columbia, Canada. The volcano and the surrounding area are protected within Mount Edziza Provincial Park. It consists of multiple peaks and ridges, with several glaciers flowing in all directions. The three main peaks around the summit caldera are the southwest summit, the southeast summit and the north summit. Ice Peak overlaps the southern flank of Mount Edziza.

History
As early as 10,000 years ago, the Tahltan people, who now live in Dease Lake, Telegraph Creek and the Iskut, used obsidian from Mount Edziza to make tools and weapons for trading material. This is the main source of obsidian found in northwestern British Columbia, which was traded as far away as Alaska and northern Alberta. Obsidian is a type of naturally occurring glass that is highly valued for its cutting qualities. Like all glass and some other types of naturally occurring rocks, obsidian breaks with a characteristic conchoidal fracture, creating razor sharp edges.

More recently, Mount Edziza was made into the Mount Edziza Provincial Park to preserve the volcanic and culture treasures unique to the northern British Columbia area. It encompasses over 230,000 hectares of the Tahltan Highland. There is no vehicle access to the park, and there are only a very few basic facilities.

See also
List of Northern Cordilleran volcanoes
Mount Edziza volcanic complex
Mountain peaks of Canada
Northern Cordilleran Volcanic Province
Volcanism of Western Canada
Geology of the Pacific Northwest

References

External links

ParkWardens
Skiing the Pacific Ring of Fire and Beyond: Mount Edziza

Mount Edziza volcanic complex
Two-thousanders of British Columbia
Stratovolcanoes of Canada
Calderas of British Columbia
Pleistocene stratovolcanoes
Polygenetic volcanoes
Pleistocene calderas